Nova Bus (stylized as NOVABUS) is a Canadian bus manufacturer headquartered in Saint-Eustache, Quebec, Canada. Nova is owned by the Volvo Group.

The company has roots in the General Motors Diesel Division, which opened in 1979. Nova Bus was established in 1993, by Nova Quintech, through the acquisition of Dial Corporation's transit division which consisted of Motor Coach Industries and Transportation Manufacturing Corporation. Volvo took partial ownership of Nova Bus in 1998 and complete ownership in 2004.

History 
Nova Bus's Saint-Eustache factory is a former General Motors plant that built city transit buses for the Canadian and US market. Inaugurated in 1979, the plant was used to produce the New Look bus (up to 1983) and the Classic (starting 1982) model for sales in Canada. In 1987 GM sold its bus-building holdings to Greyhound Dial Corporation, the parent company of Motor Coach Industries (MCI) while GMC's Rapid Transit Series (RTS) product was moved to join MCI's own designs at Transportation Manufacturing Corporation in Roswell, New Mexico.

By the 1990s, Dial intended to sell its transportation manufacturing and service divisions. The St-Eustache facility was faced with closure. The entity, known as NovaBus Corporation, was formed by individuals from Nova Quintech and the Fonds de solidarité des travailleurs du Québec to acquire MCI's St-Eustache facility from Dial. Nova Quintech was formed in 1991 after a group of investors purchased the assets of the bankrupt fire truck manufacturer Camions Pierre Thibault Inc. The Government of Quebec agreed to contribute a $2.5-million, interest-free loan, and $10 million in loan guarantees. In addition, they agreed to purchase over 300 buses between 1993 and 1994. The sale of the MCI's St-Eustache operations occurred on July 6, 1993.

MCI and TMC were spun-off from Dial in 1993, and merged with Mexican DINA S.A., who sold the TMC plant and RTS rights to Nova Bus in 1994. The RTS model was continued to be produced in the Roswell plant to meet Buy America requirements.

The Nova Classic and Nova RTS were later discontinued in order to concentrate on the Nova LFS, a low floor city bus, which was announced in 1994 with deliveries starting in 1997. The last Classic model was produced in 1997. Sales of Nova RTS were insufficient and Nova Bus closed its Roswell and Niskayuna, New York plants in 2002 to concentrate all efforts on the Canadian market. The Roswell plant was later acquired by a local consortium, Millennium Transit Services, that almost went bankrupt in 2008, then emerged from bankruptcy in 2011. The Chicago Transit Authority (CTA), which in 1998, placed an order for 484 LFS units that were manufactured and delivered between 2000 and 2002, was the first US customer to purchase a large order of this model, and remains one of the larger operators of Nova LFS buses.

By 1998, Nova Bus was then acquired by Volvo Buses and Prevost Car who owned 51% of the company while Henlys Group owned 49%. Volvo acquired Henlys remaining interest in 2004.

On February 2, 2008, NovaBus announced plans for the construction of a new assembly plant in Plattsburgh, New York, signifying the company's return to the US bus market. The plant opened on June 15, 2009. The first order from a US-based customer came from the New York City Transit Authority (NYCTA) for 90 LFS articulated buses; the NYCTA now has nearly 500 articulated and non-articulated LFSs. In March 2010, Nova Bus received the first order for the US-built, redesigned LFS from Honolulu, Hawaii's TheBus; 24 were delivered in December 2010. TheBus planned to order more, but ultimately chose buses from Gillig instead. In March 2012, the Walt Disney Company announced that it plans to test a Nova articulated bus on certain high traffic routes at the Walt Disney World Resort. In 2012, the Southeastern Pennsylvania Transportation Authority (SEPTA) ordered 315 buses, including 225 articulated buses to replace its aging Neoplan AN460 articulated buses and its remaining North American Bus Industries NABI 416 standard buses; the articulated hybrid buses were introduced in Philadelphia on October 27, 2014. In 2013, the Chicago Transit Authority placed an order for 300 40 foot Nova Bus clean-diesel buses, with an option to buy an additional 150.

Products

Current 

The LFS (Low Floor Series) is currently the only vehicle built by Nova Bus. It was the first bus designed by the company and entered production in 1996.

Since being introduced, the LFS has been redesigned several times, across four generations. Introduced as a diesel-fueled, rigid  bus, several variants have been offered over the last several decades of production.

Several alternative powertrains have been offered including compressed natural gas (CNG) fueled engines, diesel-electric hybrids (both series and parallel arrangements) and battery-electric. Articulated  versions have been offered since 2009. Nova Bus also offers suburban configurations of their 40-foot buses with one door and motorcoach style seating, and previously offered special bodywork styling packages for 62-foot buses intended for use on bus rapid transit services.

Past

See also 

 List of buses

References

External links 

1993 establishments in Quebec
Canadian companies established in 1993
Bus manufacturers of Canada
Manufacturing companies based in Quebec
Vehicle manufacturing companies established in 1993
Hybrid electric bus manufacturers
Canadian brands
Saint-Eustache, Quebec
Volvo buses
Motor vehicle manufacturers based in Quebec
Electric vehicle manufacturers of Canada
1998 mergers and acquisitions
Canadian subsidiaries of foreign companies